William Alberto Paredes Barbudo (born September 9, 1985, in Mérida, Yucatán) is a Mexican former professional footballer.

Paredes has earned one cap for Mexico, which came on September 24, 2008, in a 1–0 loss to Chile in Los Angeles.

Honours

Monterrey
 Primera División de México: Apertura 2009, Apertura 2010

References

External links

{http://msn.mediotiempo.com/futbol/mexico/noticias/2011/11/28/no-voy-a-escatimar-en-nada-william-paredes}

1985 births
Living people
Sportspeople from Mérida, Yucatán
Liga MX players
C.F. Monterrey players
San Luis F.C. players
Club Puebla players
Chiapas F.C. footballers
Footballers from Yucatán
Association football wingers
Association football fullbacks
Mexican footballers